Willingdon College, Sangli, is a college named after the former Governor of Bombay, The 1st Baron Willingdon (who was later created The 1st Marquess of Willingdon). Lord Willingdon later served as Viceroy of India, from 1931 until 1936. The college was started on the morning of 22 June 1919 in the Sangli City. During this period, Centers of higher education and colleges were rare. With the establishment of the Willingdon College, the students in Southern Maharashtra and from the districts of Belgaum, Dharwad, Karwar and Bijapur were greatly benefited. The institute is situated in the Vishrambag area of Sangli-Miraj-Kupwad Municipal Corporation, roughly midway between the twin cities of Miraj and Sangli.

Establishment
1919

Great national leaders and patriots like Vishnushastri Chiplunkar, Lokmanya Bal Gangadhar Tilak, Gopal Ganesh Agarkar and Madhavrao Namjoshi, inspired by the spirit of a nation-building ideal of education, laid the foundations in Pune, of the New English School in 1880 and the Deccan Education Society in 1884. The Fergusson college was started in 1885. In response to a demand that a College is started in Southern Maharashtra and in response to the sincere desire of the Ruler of the Sangli State, the Society founded the Willingdon College at Sangli in 1919. The President of the Society, Shrimant Chh.Shahu Maharaj, Kolhapur and the Vice-Presidents, Shrimant Patwardhan, Rulers of the Sangli and Miraj States and the generous wealthy citizens around came forth with great help for the cause. The College was started on the morning of 22 June 1919 in the Sangli City in the building where Rani Saraswati Kanya Shala stands today.

The college was named after Major The 1st Baron Willingdon, then the Governor of Bombay. Lord Willingdon later served, when he was Earl of Willingdon, as Viceroy of India. He was later, in 1936, further advanced in the peerage as The 1st Marquess of Willingdon. In the beginning, only the Arts wing was started with an enrollment of 220 students.

Silver jubilee
1944

During this period, Centers of higher education and colleges were rare. With the establishment of the Willingdon College the students in Southern Maharashtra and from the Districts of Belgaum, Dharwad, Karwar and Vijapur in Karnataka were greatly benefited. The college rendered useful service for these two provinces. Wherever we move in this area we are found to meet the past Willingdonians. In fact, to be a past Willingdonian has remained a bond of affection for many educated persons in the past. The College moved in the present buildings on 8 August 1924. At that time only the 'L' shaped wing to the East and the South were completed. the square block building of the Boys Hostel came up in 1925 and the two storied Shahu Block in 1927. In 1932–33 the Science wing was started. The name of the College by then was known for its sterling merits of education, attracting students from faraway places. The Progress of the college was rapid. During the period in 1935–44 the buildings of the Gymkhana, Quarters for Professors on either side of the approach road, the Girls Hostel, the Guest House ( Karve Sadan) and the Laboratory were set up. In 1944 the college celebrated its Silver Jubilee in an impressive manner.

Golden jubilee
1969

After the celebrations of the Silver Jubilee image of the college shone with greater brightness. During the period 1945–1957 more buildings came up, one more Hostel for the Girls, two more Hostel buildings for the Boys, Velankar Assembly Hall, Recreation Hall and an addition to the main building at the West. Today the hostel accommodates 110 Boys and 85 Girls. In the next 15 years, the Biology Laboratory, the three-storied building of the Library, Post Office, building, one more Hostel for the girls, Canteen and NCC buildings and the Open Air Theatre were completed. On the Science side subjects like Biology, Physics, Mathematics and Statistics were started. In 1969, Golden Jubilee of the College was celebrated in a splendid manner. Some past students from foreign countries attended the celebrations with deep reverence. Other past students and well-wishers of the college gave generous donations, considerably and swelling the funds of the college.

Diamond jubilee
1979

Out of the funds collected at the time of the Golden Jubilee, more constructive work was taken up. 11 new Classrooms, Teachers Hostel, (Out of the UGC funds to the extent of 2/3 of the entire expenditure), tube-well for water supply, an extension of the Gymkhana Building, Badminton Hall were completed. The College was recognized as a permanent Post Graduate Centre by the Shivaji University. On the Science side, Microbiology and Electronics and on the art side Psychology, Logic and Philosophy were added. Diamond Jubilee was celebrated with the same enthusiasm as the Golden Jubilee and received spontaneous support from all quarters.

Platinum jubilee
1994

Many projects were launched as a part of platinum jubilee celebrations such as – Pre-primary, primary and secondary ( English and Marathi Medium ) School at Willingdon Campus, Health Club, Overhead Water Tank etc. and were completed successfully.

2011

Infrastructure

Main building
A palatial quadrangular structure built in stone attracts everyone. It contains an open-air theatre with a large open space.

Building comprises

Basement – There are 4 medium-sized rooms (one room is used as a control room for University Exams.) and a storeroom.

Ground floor – It houses Principal and Vice-Principal's offices, Administrative Office, Geography Department, Staff Common Room, Ladies Common Room, Library, Departments of Botany, Mathematics, N.C.C. Office with a separate entrance, 3 big classrooms, 1 small classroom and a Strong-room for University's Central Assessment Programme. Also, an open-air theatre is located on this floor, where the Annual Prize Distribution ceremony takes place.

First floor – There are 7 big-sized rooms and my medium-sized room. Department of History, Statistics, Hindi, English, Marathi, Economics, Physics and Zoology are located on this floor.

Terrace – There is a tower on the frontal side of the main building, on which the National Flag is hoisted on 15 August, 26 January and 1 May every year. Zoology store room, Animal House is lodged on the north-west side terrace.

There are 24 classrooms in total.

Auditorium and departments

Applied Sciences Building (presently housing Microbiology, Biotechnology, Computer Science and BCS Departments)

Velankar Auditorium

 Science Departments

Department of Microbiology

Department of Biotecnology

Department of Mathematics

Department of Physics

Department of Chemistry

Department of Statistics

Department of Zoology

Department of Botany

Department of Electronics

 Arts Departments

Department of English

Department of Marathi

Department of Hindi

Department of History

Department of Economics

Department of Sanskrit

Gymkhana and a Pavilion Building

Chemistry Laboratory No.1, Chemistry Laboratory No.2, Chemistry Laboratory No.3

Other Buildings

N.C.C. Armoury

Bungalow No.1 (Principal's Residence), Bungalow No.2 (Life-member Teacher)

Bungalow No.3 (Life-member Teacher), Bungalow No.4 (Life-member Teacher)

Bungalow No.5 (Life-member Teacher), Bungalow No.6 (Life-member Teacher)

Bungalow No.7 (Life-member Teacher), U.G.C. Teachers' Hostel (4 flats)

Ladies Hostel

Boys Hostel (Shahu Block), Boys Hostel (Square Block)

Boys Hostel (Chavan Block), Boys Hostel (Kabbur Block)

Cycle stand, Hobby Workshop, Non-residential students centre

Willsoft
In 2010, the Computer Science department started conducting the competition event Willsoft.
Willsoft includes Paper Presentation, Poster Presentation, Gaming,'C' Programming,(competition events) and many others. The event enjoyed a good response in the last three years.

Year and No. of events occurred

Current principal
Dr. Bhaskar Vinayak Tamhankar (From 4 July 2014 – present)

Current vice- principals

 Dr. Suresh R Kumbhar(Electronics Department)(July 2019 onwards)
 Dr. Ravindra A KulkarniEnglish Department)(July 2019 onwards)
 Dr. Rajendra S Ponde (English Department)(July 2019 onwards)

Former principals
 Govind Chimanaji Bhate
 K.G.Pandit
 Devdatta Dabholkar
 V. K. Gokak
 R. S. Mugali
 N. B. TARE
 M.D.Hatkanaglekar
 K.M.Agashe
 Dr. B.A.Patil
 S.S.Bodas
 Dr.Harishchandra Sidram Nirmale
 Dr.Pramila Lohoti
 Dr.Bhaskar V Tamhankar

Notable students
 S. R. Ekkundi
 P. L. Deshpande

External links 
 Willingdon College

References

 http://www.willingdoncollege.in/

Colleges in India
Universities and colleges in Maharashtra
Education in Sangli district
Deccan Education Society
Shivaji University
Sangli
Educational institutions established in 1919
1919 establishments in India